The Ramparts may refer to:
 Rampart Canyon (Alaska), rapids on the Yukon River, in Alaska
 The Ramparts (Mackenzie River), 12 km of rapids, on the Mackenzie River
 The Ramparts (Canada), a mountain range